Palmulacypraea katsuae, common name : Katsua's cowry, is a species of sea snail, a cowry, a marine gastropod mollusk in the family Cypraeidae, the cowries.

There are two subspecies :
Palmulacypraea katsuae guidoi (Lorenz, 2002)
Palmulacypraea katsuae katsuae (Kuroda, 1960): represented as Palmulacypraea katsuae katsuae (Kuroda, 1960)· accepted, alternate representation

Description
The shell size varies between 15 mm and 24 mm. Cowries are prized for their beauty and diversity, and are mostly used for jewellry.

Distribution
This species occurs in the Pacific Ocean off Japan and the Philippines; also off New Caledonia.

References

 Kuroda, T. (1960). Okinawa guntosan kairui mokuroku (tosokurui o nozoku). A catalogue of the molluscan fauna of the Okinawa Islands (exclusive of the Cephalopoda). Okinawa, Naha-Shi: Ryukyu University Kyomubu Fukyuka. iv, 106 pp., 3 plates.
 Bouchet, P.; Fontaine, B. (2009). List of new marine species described between 2002–2006. Census of Marine Life.

External links
 

Cypraeidae
Gastropods described in 1960